The Darul Jambangan (Palace of Flowers) was the palace of the Sultanate of Sulu based in Maimbung, Sulu, Philippines. It was destroyed by a typhoon in 1932. It was "believed to be the largest royal palace in the Philippines."

A contemporary life-sized replica of the palace exists on Jolo, Sulu.

References

Landmarks in the Philippines
Palaces in the Philippines